Konstantin Khazbiyevich Dzutsev (born 22 October 1970) is a Russian professional football coach and a former player.

Club career
As a player, he made his debut in the Russian Second Division in 1992 for FC Dynamo Kemerovo. He played 4 seasons in the Russian Football National League.

Honours
 Russian Professional Football League Zone East best coach: 2016–17.

References

1970 births
Living people
People from Kemerovo
Sportspeople from Kemerovo Oblast
Russian footballers
Association football midfielders
Association football defenders
FC Dynamo Barnaul players
Russian football managers
FC Sibir Novosibirsk players
FC SKA-Khabarovsk players